The Defense Plant Corporation,(DPC), was subsidiary of the Reconstruction Finance Corporation, a government corporation run by the United States Federal Government between 1940 and 1945. To win World War II the United States and its Allied Nations needed massive war production. Many private companies did not have the capital funds to meet the wartime demand for buildings and equipment. Defense Plant Corporation provided financial support to state and local governments. Defense Plant Corporation also made loans to banks, railroads, mortgage associations, and other businesses supporting the war efforts.

History
Reconstruction Finance Corporation (RFC) was founded in 1932 by Herbert Hoover to help with the Great Depression, with the outbreak of World War II, it became a war department. Fund requests usually started with the United States Navy, United States Army, War Shipping Administration, Office of Production Management, the War Production Board, Maritime Commission or other war departments. Reconstruction Finance Corporation had eight subsidiaries. Most requests for new factories and new mills were given to the Defense Plant Corporation. The head of the Defense Plant Corporation was Jesse H. Jones, with Emil Schram and Sam Husbands. Jesse H. Jones (1874–1956) was a politician and entrepreneur from Houston, Texas.  Defense Plant Corporation would also offer oversight that factories were constructed, equipped, and operated. By the time Defense Plant Corporation closed in 1945 it had funded over $9 billion into the wartime factories. The funds went to over 2,300 projects in 46 US states and in foreign countries. In most projects, the government owned factories and leased them to private companies.
Major factories built were aircraft manufacturing (50% of funds), tanks plants, nonferrous metals, machine tools, synthetic rubber, shipyards and boat yards.
The largest project was $176 million for Dodge's Chicago aircraft engine plant. The Dodge Chicago plant manufactured engines for the Boeing B-29 Superfortress and Consolidated B-32 Dominator. The Dodge Chicago 1,545 acres with a steel forge and aluminum foundry. With the war coming to an end Defense Plant Corporation was ended on July 1, 1945.

Funded

Some companies funded:
Ben's Original
Citgo to funded synthetic rubber 
Willow Run
Sangamon Ordnance Plant
EMD Model 40 plant
Homestead Steel Works
Southwest Power Pool
Wright's Automatic Machinery Company 
Contract Flying School Airfields
General Motors's Central Foundry Division and other plants
Big Inch
Baldwin Locomotive Works
Holston Army Ammunition Plant
U.S. Steel Duquesne Works
Sangamon Ordnance Plant

See also
 Resolution Trust Corporation
 Federal Emergency Management Agency
 Emergency Relief and Construction Act

External links
 Records of the Reconstruction Finance Corporation

References 

Defense Plant Corporation
1945 disestablishments in the United States
Agencies of the United States government during World War II
Corporations chartered by the United States Congress
Defunct agencies of the United States government
Government agencies established in 1940
United States government-sponsored enterprises
Herbert Hoover
1940 establishments in the United States
Government agencies disestablished in 1945